is an eroge and OVA with only two episodes. The whole series features frequent sexual intercourse, oral sex and masturbation and revolves around a college student, Takakage.

Plot 
The story opens in Sengoku era Japan. The atmosphere is somewhat weary. The soldiers of a certain clan rest as they prepare for a final battle on the following morning. Genshiro, a soldier (or possibly a samurai as it is shown), is with his girlfriend, Ayame, who fears for his life. He proposes to her, and she accepts. They embrace and make love.

The scene moves to modern day Tokyo, where the protagonist of the story, Takakage Takasaka, wakes up realising he has had a wet dream.  It confuses him a lot, and he wonders if it was only a dream or that really happened. He has breakfast with his stepsister, Maiko. He narrates the day she will join him at a certain University of Arts.

They go to school together and are met by Takakage's childhood friend, Mayumi Hiragi, who claims to be able to tell fortunes, and predicts that he's going to fall in love with a very beautiful girl that he is going to meet very soon. Then comes the perverted friend of Takakage, Tateno. He tries to flirt with Maiko. Maiko realizes she has had the same sex dream as her brother.  Shortly after, Takakage encounters a pretty young girl, Ayame, who looks exactly like the girl in his dreams.

Characters 

Takakage: A very nice, easy going guy, who is having sex with every girl. Eventually he got a fortune from his childhood friend Mayumi, that he will fall in love with a beautiful woman. Later on, the fortune comes true and falls in love with Ayame. After her death, his sister tells him that she is the incarnation of Ayame. Then they end up together dating, and having sex. It was assumed that it was also revealed that Maiko really isn't his sister.

Mayumi: She is Takakage's childhood friend, and she has a crush on him ever since. She is trying to hide it as much as possible, but later, she cannot resist the temptation and changes her look into an innocent new school girl "Chisato" and she asks him out.  Later they had sex in a hotel, then the guilt causes "Chisato" to reveal herself as Mayumi, and express her feelings for him. Takakage turns her down, because he doesn't see her as his girlfriend.

Maiko: As the series begins she is introduced to the audience as Takakage's sister, who he cares about a lot and feels like his parents rather than his brother. After a while Meiko is starting to have desires of being with her "brother" in the same bed, having sex, but she is afraid she is having dirty thoughts about her brother, but lucky for her, later it shows that he isn't her brother and she can tell him about her desires and they started dating and having sex in the end.

Ayame: A young priestess who lives in a shrine and was a love interest/wife of Genshiro, a young soldier. She wanted to save her love from dying and cast a spell of immortality, but cast it on herself by mistake and couldn't save her love, Genshiro. Either she couldn't kill herself cause of the spell, then she lived over 400 years and after she met Genshiro's reincarnation, Takakage, she falls in love with him. Later on, she decided to reverse immortality spell and live with Takakage in peace, but she died instead.

Genshiro: Love interest/husband of Ayame, a young soldier, comes back to the shrine, even though he was fatally injured, to save her from being raped by an enemy soldier, then he collapsed from severe blood loss, and dies.

Media 

Campus is made up of two episodes, both of which are in one DVD.

Reception

En Hong finds that "The first episode is merely a conglomeration of scenes 'thrust' upon each other with a 'loose' plot to 'bind' them together" and that the production values are lacking, but noted it was effective as a hentai work, "accomplishes what it sets out to do (every girl that makes an appearance)".  Chris Beveridge thinks that Campus is one of the "simple, but done well" titles from the Vanilla Series line, and points out the lack of "non-consensual scenes", not "terribly explicit" sex scenes, and "a focus on dating and romance" to make it recommended for couples' viewing.  Alex Roberts characterised Campus as "solid, but unspectacular". Mike Toole wrote "Here's another filthy cartoon that involves flashbacks and magic use. It has character designs that are cute, if unusual, surprisingly decent animation, and a completely bugfuck time-twisting storyline."

References

External links
 

2000 anime OVAs
Eroge
Hentai anime and manga
Anime film and television articles using incorrect naming style